David Livingston (born December 29, 1962) is an American former professional tennis player.

Born in Albuquerque, Livingston played college tennis for UCLA from 1982 to 1985. A doubles All-American in 1984, he was a member of two UCLA championship winning teams.

Livingston turned professional after leaving UCLA and in 1986 reached the second round of the Japan Open Grand Prix tournament. He also played #1 doubles and singles representing the United States in a diplomatic envoy to China. It was in doubles that he had more success, with a best ranking of 98 in the world. He featured in the doubles main draw at the 1987 US Open and won two ATP Challenger doubles titles.

Challenger titles

Doubles: (2)

References

External links
 
 

1962 births
Living people
American male tennis players
Tennis people from California
UCLA Bruins men's tennis players
Sportspeople from Albuquerque, New Mexico